Pchelinovka is a rural locality (a selo) and the administrative center of Pchelinovskoye Rural Settlement, Bobrovsky District, Voronezh Oblast, Russia. The population was 634 as of 2010. The locality contains 11 streets.

Geography 
Pchelinovka is located 22 km south of Bobrov (the district's administrative centre) by road. Nikolo-Varvarinka is the nearest rural locality.

References 

Rural localities in Bobrovsky District